Alan Girotto Mota (born September 12, 1986 in São Paulo), known as Alan Mota, is a Brazilian footballer who plays for Taubaté as midfielder.

Career statistics

References

External links

1986 births
Living people
Brazilian footballers
Association football midfielders
Campeonato Brasileiro Série B players
Campeonato Brasileiro Série C players
Campeonato Brasileiro Série D players
Esporte Clube Taubaté players
Mogi Mirim Esporte Clube players
Nacional Atlético Clube (SP) players
S.C. Beira-Mar players
Capivariano Futebol Clube players
América Futebol Clube (MG) players
Botafogo Futebol Clube (SP) players
Clube Atlético Taboão da Serra players
Clube Atlético Bragantino players
Marília Atlético Clube players
Grêmio Osasco Audax Esporte Clube players
Ituano FC players
Grêmio Barueri Futebol players
Footballers from São Paulo